The Slater and Devil fires were two fires that burned in Northern California and Southern Oregon during the 2020 California wildfire season. The fires burned , claimed two lives, injured 12 people, and were 100% contained on November 16. The fires caused some highway reconstructions and forest closures.

Timeline 
The Slater and Devil fires were first reported on September 8, 2020, west of Happy Camp, California. The Slater fire crossed the Oregon border into Josephine County, Oregon within hours of initial attack, with little containment. Both fires were declared contained on November 16th, 2020.

Impact  
Due to the fires, the Klamath National Forest, Six Rivers National Forest and Rogue River-Siskiyou National Forest were temporarily closed..  Two firefighters died as a result of the fires, the town of Gasquet and US Highway 199 were temporarily evacuated, and 12 people suffered injuries from the fire. Reconstruction began on November 24, 2020 on damaged roads, including CA 96, and on destroyed buildings. Damage from the fire has been estimated at nearly $54 million.

See also 

2020 California wildfires
2020 Oregon wildfires
Klamath Theater Complex Fire

References 

2020 California wildfires
Wildfires in Siskiyou County, California
Wildfires in Del Norte County, California
2020 Oregon wildfires